Andrey Ivanovich Bocharov (born 14 October 1969) is a Russian politician and former military officer who currently serves as the Governor of Volgograd Oblast since 2014.

He served as a deputy in the State Duma of the Russian Federation for the fifth and sixth convocations from 2007 to 2012 and as Deputy Governor of the Bryansk Oblast from 2005 to 2007. He was awarded the title of the Hero of the Russian Federation in 1996.

Career

Andrey Bocharov was born in Barnaul on 14 October 1969. As a child, he moved to the Starodubsky District of the Bryansk Oblast with his family. In 1987, he graduated from the Moscow Suvorov Military School and enrolled in the Ryazan Higher Airborne Command School.

Military 

In 1991, Bocharov graduated from the Ryazan Higher Airborne Command School. He then took on positions such as a platoon commander, commander of the Parachute Battalion, and served in the airborne troops. He was also a senior officer in the military unit headquarters and served in the 104th Guards Airborne Division at Ulyanovsk.

The First Chechen War and the title of Hero of Russia

Andrey Bocharov took part in the First Chechen Campaign, leading the reconnaissance in March 1995. During this time, he managed to capture a key militant defense site in the village of Komsomolsk, which was occupied by as many as 40 militants. Bocharov killed 16 militants and captured three prisoners. In 20 July 1996, Bocharov was awarded the title Hero of the Russian Federation for courage and heroism by the Presidential Decree number 1064.

Political activity 
Bocharov has held many political titles. In December 1998, he became the Chairman of the Union of Heroes of the Russian Council. He then became the Deputy Governor of the Bryansk Oblast in January 2005. Between 2007 and 2012, he acted as the Deputy of the State Duma, before becoming the Chief Federal Inspector in the Bryansk Oblast between October 2012 and August 2013. Soon after, he became the head of the executive committee of the federal headquarters of All Russia People's Front. On 2 April 2014, he was appointed as the acting governor of Volgograd Oblast by presidential decree. He assumed office on 24 September 2014 after receiving over 88% of the vote .

The Governor of the Volgograd Oblast

In order to become the Governor of the Volgograd Oblast, Bocharov defeated Nikolai Parshin, a State Duma deputy from the Communist Party, who was later prosecuted for criminal activity. Andrey Bocharov supported the investigations, stating that the fight against corruption must be carried out regardless of positions and party regalia and hinted, "there are more strong shocks and high-profile revelations ahead."

Controversy 
Andrey Bocharov has been openly associated with the criminal case against Volgograd political blogger Andrey Devyatkin, who has been placed in a psychiatric hospital. However, Bocharov did not appear in the official case.

Bocharov has also tried to obtain federal funds for the revival of the chemical plant Khimprom. Khimprom was previously used to manufacture nerve agents and various dual-use chemicals.

Additional information 
In November 2016, Bocharov was the victim of an attempted arson. The suspect has not yet been named, but investigators claim that the attempt was connected to Bocharov's political involvement.

References

External links

 Профайл на портале Губернатора Волгоградской области
 Профайл на сайте Государственной Думы ФС РФ

1969 births
Living people
United Russia politicians
Governors of Volgograd Oblast
Ryazan Guards Higher Airborne Command School alumni
Heroes of the Russian Federation
Fifth convocation members of the State Duma (Russian Federation)
Sixth convocation members of the State Duma (Russian Federation)